Znicz Biała Piska is a Polish semi-professional football club from Biała Piska, Pisz County, Warmian-Masurian Voivodeship.

History
The club was founded on 18 July 1954 as Ludowy Klub Sportowy Znicz Biała Piska, as a local LZS club in the local leagues.
 

In 1974 they ceased activity for 4 years, before resuming activity in 1978 as Międzyzakładowy Klub Sportowy Znicz Biała Piska, becoming an unaffiliated works team. Despite some minor league successes, by 1996 the club dissolved its senior team, although continued to exist as a sports club focusing on youth development.

Two mergers followed: with Orkan Drygały in 1999 creating Znicz/Orkan Biała Piska restoring the senior team; and with Płomień Ełk in 2000 creating Płomień/Znicz Biała Piska.

Between 2000-2004 they played in the fourth division. After relegation in 2004 the club suffered financial and organisational problems, and changed its name to Miejski Ludowy Klub Sportowy Znicz Biała Piska.

Their fortunes changed however, winning their division in 2011 and a further promotion in 2013 reaching their highest league hierarchy in their history.

In 2018 they won their fifth division with a 30 point lead. Subsequently in the next two seasons, 2018/2019 and 2019/2020, the reached the finals of the Warmian-Mazurian Polish Cup, but lost both finals.

Scouting network
Due to the club's remote location and the town's small population, the club has a wide catchment area in order to remain competitive, attract a good calibre of players and keep its youth teams in full squad. Players are recruited regularly from Białystok, Podlasie Voivodeship, Ełk and Pisz.

Rivalries
Znicz has local derbies against GKS Wikielec and Mamry Giżycko.

Honours
Fifth Division
Winners: 2018, 2011
Runners-up: 2013
Sixth Division:
Winners: 2011
Seventh Division:
Winners: 2008, 1985
Warmian-Masurian Polish Cup:
Runners-up: 2019, 2020
Semi-finals: 2013
Quarter-finals: 2021, 2018

Notable players
Notable professional players who played for the club include Oskar Fürst, Vasili Sumnakaev, Artsyom Huzik, Jacek Falkowski, and Vasily Zhurnevich.

References

Bibliography

External links
 - 90minut.pl profile

Football clubs in Poland
Association football clubs established in 1954
1954 establishments in Poland
Football clubs in Warmian-Masurian Voivodeship